Angus MacFarlane may refer to:

 Gus MacFarlane (1925–1991), Canadian Liberal MP for Hamilton Mountain, 1974–1979
Angus Hikairo Macfarlane, New Zealand academic and professor at the University of Canterbury
 Angus MacFarlane (bishop) (1843–1912), Scottish Roman Catholic Bishop of Dunkeld, 1901–1912